Snæfellsbær is a municipality located in western Iceland, in the southwestern part of the Snæfellsnes Peninsula Its administrative centre is Hellissandur and the majority of the residents live in Ólafsvík then Hellissandur and Rif.

Twin towns – sister cities

Snæfellsbær is twinned with:
 Vestmanna, Faroe Islands

See also
Búðir
Djúpalónssandur

References 

Municipalities of Iceland
Populated places in Western Region (Iceland)